A 72-hour clause, typically inserted in real estate sale contracts, is also known as an escape clause, release clause, kick-out clause, hedge clause or right of first refusal clause.

The 72-hour clause is a seller contingency which allows the seller to accept a buyer's contingent offer to purchase his/her property, while allowing the seller to continue to market the property.

If the seller now receives another (better) offer to purchase the same property, he/she can also accept this offer, as a back-up offer. The seller can then activate the escape clause by notifying the original buyer about the back-up offer.

The first buyer now has a specified period of time to fulfil all the buyer contingencies in the contract of sale, or cancel the contract and lose the property. If the buyer cannot fulfil the contingencies in time, the original contract will cancel and the back-up offer will move into first position.

The term 72-hour clause can be somewhat misleading, because the notice period within which the buyer must fulfill the buyer contingencies can be negotiated. The effective notice period may therefore be longer or shorter than 72 hours. Further ambiguities arise if the 72 hours were only considered counted on business working days, excluding weekends and legal holidays

References

.

Real property law
Contract clauses